Mackenzie House is a historic building and museum in Toronto, Ontario, Canada that was the last home of William Lyon Mackenzie, the city's first mayor. It is now a museum operated by the City of Toronto's Museum and Heritage Services.

History
The house at 82 Bond Street was bought for Mackenzie by his friends and supporters in 1858. He died in the house in 1861.

In March 1864 the sheriff of Toronto seized the property due to unpaid financial obligations. The property was bought by John Taylor who allowed the Mackenzie family to remain in the house without paying rent. Four years later Isabel Mackenzie repurchased the home with expenses paid by the Ontario Legislature for William's pilgrimage to London in the 1830s.

The neighbouring row houses were demolished in 1936, while Mackenzie's grandson, William Lyon Mackenzie King, was Prime Minister. However, this house was saved because of its historical significance.

Grounds 
The building was designed in the Georgian architecture style, and is presently operated as a municipally run historic house museum about 1860s Urban Victorian life.

On the grounds are the side panels of the Memorial Arch that once stood at the foot of the Honeymoon Bridge in Niagara Falls, Ontario. Built in 1930s, the arch was demolished in 1960s and the panels stored until it was moved to Toronto in 1974. It is installed in an area next to the historic home.

Museum 

Mackenzie House is one of ten historic museums owned and operated by the City of Toronto. It focuses on the life and times of the Mackenzie family and Mackenzie's role as a newspaper editor and politician. The museum also depicts life in Toronto of the 1860s to the 1890s, including programs focused on Black Canadians and Mary Ann Shadd.

The Museum is affiliated with CMA, CHIN, and Virtual Museum of Canada.

See also
List of museums in Toronto

References

 Mackenzie House
 Cruikshank, Tom. Old Toronto Houses. Toronto: Firefly Books, 2003.

See also

 List of oldest buildings and structures in Toronto

Georgian architecture in Canada
Historic house museums in Ontario
Houses in Toronto
Museums in Toronto
City of Toronto Heritage Properties